Death in the Clouds is a work of detective fiction by British writer  Agatha Christie, first published in the US by Dodd, Mead and Company on 10 March 1935 under the title of Death in the Air and in the UK by the Collins Crime Club in July of the same year under Christie's original title. The US edition retailed at $2.00 and the UK edition at seven shillings and sixpence (7/6). The book features the Belgian detective Hercule Poirot and Chief Inspector Japp.

Plot summary
Hercule Poirot travels back to England on the midday flight from  Le Bourget Airfield in Paris to Croydon Airport in London. He is one of eleven passengers in the plane's rear compartment. The others include mystery writer Daniel Clancy; French archaeologists Armand Dupont and his son Jean; dentist Norman Gale; Doctor Bryant; French moneylender Madame Giselle; businessman James Ryder; Cicely, Countess of Horbury; the Honourable Venetia Kerr; and Jane Grey. As the plane is close to landing, a wasp is spotted flying around the rear compartment before a steward finds that Giselle is dead. Poirot, who has slept through most of the flight, dismisses the belief she died from a wasp sting. Instead, he points out a dart on the floor, which is found to have a poisoned tip: Giselle was stung in the neck with it. The question remains how she was murdered without anyone noticing.

The police find a small blowpipe in the side of Poirot's seat. Annoyed at being identified as a suspect, he vows to clear his name and solve the case. Requesting a list of the passengers' possessions, he notes something that intrigues him but doesn't say what it is or to which passenger it refers. Aided by Jane in the investigation, Poirot works with Inspector Japp in England and Inspector Fournier in France. Clues gradually emerge: the victim had two coffee spoons with her cup and saucer; the blowpipe was bought in Paris by an American man; Lady Horbury is one of Giselle's debtors, and had been cut off from her husband's money; Giselle employed blackmail to ensure that her debtors didn't miss their repayments; only the stewards and Clancy passed by the victim on the flight; Lady Horbury's maid was on the flight after asking to be on it at the last moment.

Poirot pursues his enquiries in both London and Paris. On a flight to Paris, he conducts an experiment that shows that the use of the blowpipe, or anything similar, would have been noticed by the other passengers. It subsequently emerges that Giselle has an estranged daughter, Anne Morisot, who now stands to inherit her fortune. Poirot meets Anne and learns that she has an American or Canadian husband, whom she married a month earlier. Poirot afterwards comments that he feels that he has seen Anne before. When Jane makes a remark about needing to file a nail, he realises that Anne was Lady Horbury's maid Madeleine – he had seen her come into the rear compartment during the flight when Lady Horbury summoned her to fetch a dressing-case. He immediately instructs Fournier to find Anne. French police discover her body on the boat-train to Boulogne, with a bottle beside it; she appears to have poisoned herself.

Poirot makes his dénouement of the case in the presence of Japp, Gale, and Clancy. Giselle's killer was Norman Gale, who sought her fortune. The murder was carefully planned: Gale had brought his dentist's coat on the flight, which he changed into after some time to pose as a steward, knowing no-one would pay attention to such a person. Under the guise of delivering a spoon to Giselle, he stabbed her with the dart, then removed his coat and returned to his seat before the body was found. Anne's murder was part of the plan – Gale married her when he learned she was Giselle's daughter, intending to kill her at a later date in Canada, after she had received her mother's estate, and having ensured that he would in turn inherit the money from her. However, he had to kill her earlier than planned because she claimed her inheritance on the same day that Poirot met her.

The wasp that buzzed around in the rear compartment was released from a matchbox that Gale brought with him; both this and his coat had aroused Poirot's suspicions when he read the list of passengers' possessions. Both the wasp and the blowpipe, which Gale planted in the cabin, were intended to mislead. Gale denies Poirot's theory, but after Poirot lies to him about the police finding his fingerprints on the bottle that contained the poison, he inadvertently lets slip that he wore gloves in Anne's murder. Gale is arrested. Afterwards, Poirot pairs off Jane with Jean Dupont, who had fallen in love with her during the case.

Reception
The Times Literary Supplement of 4 July 1935 summarized thus: "Any of the other nine passengers and two stewards could be suspected. And all of them were, including Clancy, the writer of detective stories, whom the author evidently enjoys making absurd. It will be a very acute reader who does not receive a complete surprise at the end."

The Times in its main paper gave the book a second review in its issue of 2 July 1935 when they described its plot as "ingenious" and commented on the fact that Christie had evolved a method of presenting a crime in a confined space (with reference to The Mystery of the Blue Train and Murder on the Orient Express) which "however often employed, never loses its originality."

Isaac Anderson in The New York Times Book Review of 24 March 1935 began his column:

In The Observer'''s issue of 30 June 1935, "Torquemada" (Edward Powys Mathers) started his review, "My admiration for Mrs. Christie is such that with each new book of hers I strain every mental nerve to prove that she has failed, at last, to hypnotize me. On finishing Death in the Clouds, I found that she had succeeded even more triumphantly than usual." He concluded, "I hope that some readers of this baffling case will foresee at least the false denouement. I did not even do that. Agatha Christie has recently developed two further tricks: one is, as of the juggler who keeps on dropping things, to leave a clue hanging out for several chapters, apparently unremarked by her little detective though seized on by us, and then to tuck it back again as unimportant. Another is to give us some, but by no means all, of the hidden thoughts of her characters. We readers must guard against these new dexterities. As for Poirot, it is only to him and to Cleopatra that a certain remark about age and custom is strictly applicable. But might not Inspector Japp be allowed to mellow a little, with the years, beyond the moron stage?"

An admirer of Christie, Milward Kennedy of The Guardian began his review of 30 July 1935, "Very few authors achieve the ideal blend of puzzle and entertainment as often does Agatha Christie." He did admit that, "Death in the Clouds may not rank with her greatest achievements, but it is far above the average detective story." He finished by saying, "Mrs Christie provides a little gallery of thumb-nail sketches of plausible characters; she gives us all the clues and even tells us where to look for them; we ought to find the murderer by reason, but are not likely to succeed except by guesswork."

A review in the Daily Mirror of 20 July 1935 concluded, "We leave Poirot to figure it all out. He is at it and in it, with his usual brilliance, till the end."

Robert Barnard: "Exceptionally lively specimen, with wider than usual class and type-range of suspects. Scrupulously fair, with each clue presented openly and discussed. Note Clancy the crime writer, and the superiority of French police to British (no signs of insularity here)."

References or allusions

References to other works
In Chapter 6, Monsieur Fournier makes reference to Monsieur Giraud, the French detective whom Poirot meets in Murder on the Links.
In Chapter 7, Poirot refers to a case of poisoning in which the killer uses a "psychological" moment to his advantage, an allusion to Three Act Tragedy.
In Chapter 21, Poirot refers to a case in which all the suspects were lying, an allusion to Murder on the Orient Express.

References in other works
In Chapter 12 of a later Poirot novel, Mrs McGinty's Dead (1952), Christie's alter ego, Ariadne Oliver, refers to a novel of hers in which she made a blowpipe one foot long, only to be told later that they were six feet long. This was a belated but sly and self-referential acknowledgement of a fundamental error in the plot of Death in the Clouds.

Allusions to real life
An event experienced by Christie herself, shortly after her second marriage (to Sir Max Mallowan), and described in her Autobiography, is alluded to in Chapter 13. "Imagine, in a little hotel in Syria was an Englishman whose wife had been taken ill. He himself had to be somewhere in Iraq by a certain date. Eh bien, would you believe it, he left his wife and went on so as to be on duty in time? And both he and his wife thought that quite natural; they thought him noble, unselfish. But the doctor, who was not English, thought him a barbarian."

Adaptations
Television
British live-action adaptation
The novel was adapted as an episode for the series Agatha Christie's Poirot, in 1992. It starred David Suchet as Hercule Poirot, and Philip Jackson as Chief Inspector James Japp. Although the adaptation remained largely faithful to most of the novel's plot, it featured a number of changes:

 The characters of Dr Bryant, James Ryder and Armand Dupont are omitted from the adaptation; Jean Dupont is the only archaeologist on the flight.
 The aircraft is a slightly anachronistic Douglas DC-3, instead of a Handley Page H.P.42 as described in the novel. The DC3 first flew in December 1935, the novel is set in June 1935 (Poirot watches Fred Perry winning the French Championships). All H.P.42s had been destroyed by 1940, and the still-flying DC3 used in the production, registration G-AMRA, was built in 1944.
 Poirot is assisted by Japp throughout the investigation; he comes with him to investigate the case in France. Inspector Fournier is given a lesser role as a result.
 The details of some of the characters are modified:
 Jane Grey is an air stewardess on the flight. Although she works with Poirot on the case, she is not matched up with anyone at its conclusion.
 Daniel Clancy suffers from a mental malady, in which he believe his fictional detective has a control on his life. He attends the denouement mainly to learn who the killer is, rather than witnessing a real-life detective at work.
 Venetia Kerr and Poirot do not change seats on the flight.
 Anne Morisot (a.k.a. Madeleine) has married Gale in Paris, not Rotterdam.
Armand Dupont is dead for two years.
 Poirot meets some of the suspects at a tennis match he attends in Paris, by invitation of Jane.

Japanese animated adaptation
It was later adapted as the final 4 episodes of the Japanese animated television series Agatha Christie's Great Detectives Poirot and Marple, airing in 2005.

Radio
The novel was adapted for radio by BBC Radio 4 in 2003, featuring John Moffatt as Poirot, Philip Jackson as Chief Inspector Japp (as in the Agatha Christie's Poirot adaptation), Geoffrey Whitehead as Monsieur Fournier, and Teresa Gallagher as Jane Grey.

In popular culture
 The novel is referenced notably in the Doctor Who episode "The Unicorn and the Wasp", which featured both the Doctor and Donna meeting Agatha Christie in the year 1926, and investigating a series of murders alongside her that were inspired by her novels to that date, committed by a giant, alien wasp. The Doctor notably remarks towards the end of the episode, that although Christie's memories of the events were erased after the wasp's death, she recalled them in such a way, that they later inspired her to write Death in the Clouds with the inclusion of a wasp as part of its plot.

Publication history

 , 304 pp.
 , 256 pp.
 , 259 pp.
 , 188 pp.
 , 189 pp.
 , 188 pp.
 , 219 pp.
 , 256 pp.
 , 256 pp
  (facsimile of 1935 UK first edition).

The book was first serialised in the US in The Saturday Evening Post in six instalments from 9 February (Volume 207, Number 32) to 16 March 1935 (Volume 207, Number 37) under the title Death in the Air with illustrations by Frederick Mizen.

In the UK, the novel was serialised as an abridged version in the weekly Women's Pictorial magazine in six instalments from 16 February (Volume 29, Number 736) to 23 March 1935 (Volume 29, Number 741) under the title Mystery in the Air''. There were no chapter divisions and all of the instalments carried illustrations by Clive Uptton.

References

External links
 .
 
 .

1935 British novels
Hercule Poirot novels
Works originally published in The Saturday Evening Post
Novels first published in serial form
Dodd, Mead & Co. books
British novels adapted into television shows
Croydon Airport
Aviation novels
Novels set in London
Novels set in Paris